Birger Grønn (17 April 1898 – 28 March 1988) was a Norwegian engineer. He was born in Kristiania. He graduated as ships engineer at the Norwegian Institute of Technology in 1922, and worked as engineer and later manager at the ships workshop Trondhjems mekaniske Værksted from 1939 to 1963. He was decorated with the British King's Medal for Courage. During World War II he was member of the undercover resistance movement in Trondheim, and after the war he was recruited to the secret stay-behind network.

References

1898 births
1988 deaths
Engineers from Oslo
Norwegian resistance members
20th-century Norwegian engineers
Norwegian Institute of Technology alumni
Recipients of the King's Medal for Courage in the Cause of Freedom